Vasant G. Honavar is an Indian born American computer scientist, and artificial intelligence, machine learning, big data, data science, causal inference, knowledge representation, bioinformatics and health informatics researcher and professor.

Early life and education

Vasant Honavar was born at Poona, India to Bhavani G. and Gajanan N. Honavar. He received his early education at the Vidya Vardhaka Sangha High School and M.E.S. College in Bangalore, India. He received a B.E. in Electronics & Communications Engineering from the B.M.S. College of Engineering in Bangalore, India in 1982, when it was affiliated with Bangalore University, an M.S. in electrical and computer engineering in 1984 from Drexel University, and an M.S. in computer science in 1989, and a Ph.D. in 1990, respectively, from the University of Wisconsin–Madison, where he studied Artificial Intelligence and worked with Leonard Uhr.

Career

Honavar is on the faculty of Penn State College of Information Sciences and Technology at Pennsylvania State University where he currently holds the Dorothy Foehr Huck and J. Lloyd Huck Chair in Biomedical Data Sciences and Artificial Intelligence and previously held the Edward Frymoyer Endowed Chair in Information Sciences and Technology. He serves on the faculties of the graduate programs in Computer Science, Informatics, Bioinformatics and Genomics,   Neuroscience, Operations Research, Public Health Sciences, and of an undergraduate program in Data Science. Honavar serves as the Director of the Artificial Intelligence Research Laboratory, Associate Director of the Institute for Computational and Data Sciences and the Director of the Center for Artificial Intelligence Foundations and Scientific Applications at Pennsylvania State University. Honavar serves on the Leadership Team of the Northeast Big Data Innovation Hub. Honavar served on the Computing Research Association's Computing Community Consortium Council during 2014-2017, where he chaired the task force on Convergence of Data and Computing, and was a member of the task force on Artificial Intelligence. 

Honavar was the first Sudha Murty Distinguished Visiting Chair of Neurocomputing and Data Science by the Indian Institute of Science, Bangalore, India. Honavar was named a Distinguished Member of the Association for Computing Machinery for "outstanding scientific contributions to computing"; and elected a Fellow of the American Association for the Advancement of Science for his "distinguished research contributions and leadership in data science".

As a Program Director in the Information Integration and Informatics program in the Information and Intelligent Systems Division of the Computer and Information Science and Engineering Directorate of the US National Science Foundation during 2010-13, Honavar led the Big Data Program.

Honavar was a professor of computer science at Iowa State University where he led the Artificial Intelligence Research Laboratory which he founded in 1990 and was instrumental in establishing an interdepartmental graduate program in Bioinformatics and Computational Biology (and served as its Chair during 2003–2005). 

Honavar has held visiting professorships at Carnegie Mellon University, the University of Wisconsin–Madison, and at the Indian Institute of Science.

Research
Honavar has made substantial research contributions in artificial intelligence, machine learning, causal inference, knowledge representation, neural networks, semantic web, big data analytics, and bioinformatics and computational biology. He was a program chair of the Association for the Advancement of Artificial Intelligence(AAAI)'s 36th Conference on Artificial Intelligence. He has published over 300 research articles, including many highly cited ones, as well as several books on these topics. His recent work has focused on federated machine learning algorithms for constructing predictive models from distributed data and linked open data, learning predictive models from high dimensional longitudinal data, estimating causal effects from complex data, reasoning with federated knowledge bases, detecting algorithmic bias, big data analytics, analysis and prediction of protein-protein, protein-RNA, and protein-DNA interfaces and interactions, social network analytics, health informatics, secrecy-preserving query answering, representing and reasoning about preferences, and causal inference and meta analysis.

Honavar has been active in fostering national and international scientific collaborations in Artificial Intelligence, Data Sciences, and their applications in addressing national, international, and societal priorities in accelerating science, improving health, transforming agriculture through partnerships that bring together academia, non-profits, and industry. He is also active in making the science policy case for major national research initiatives such as AI for accelerating science and AI for combating the epidemic of diseases of despair.

Selected publications

Books

 Vasant Honavar and Leonard Uhr. (Ed.) Artificial Intelligence and Neural Networks: Steps Toward Principled Integration. New York: Academic Press. 1994. 
 Vasant Honavar and Giora Slutzki (Ed). Grammatical Inference. Berlin: Springer-Verlag. 1998. 
 Mukesh Patel, Vasant Honavar and Karthik Balakrishnan (Ed). Advances in the Evolutionary Synthesis of Intelligent Agents. Cambridge, MA: MIT Press. 2001. 
 Ganesh Ram Santhanam, Samik Basu, and Vasant Honavar. Representing and Reasoning with Qualitative Preferences: Tools and Applications. Lecture #31, Synthesis Lectures on Artificial Intelligence and Machine Learning. Morgan & Claypool Publishers. 2016. ,

Articles
Position papers on artificial Intelligence, data sciences and related topics
 Barocas, S., Bradley, E., Honavar, V. and Provost, F. (2017). Big Data, Data Science, and Civil Rights. Computing Community Consortium. arXiv preprint arxiv:1706.03102.
 Hager, G., Bryant, R., Horvitz, E., Mataric, M., and Honavar, V. (2017). Advances in Artificial Intelligence Require Progress Across all of Computer Science. Computing Community Consortium. arXiv preprint arXiv:1707.04352
 Honavar, V., Yelick, K., Nahrstedt, K., Rushmeier, H., Rexford, J., Hill, Mark., Bradley, E., and Mynatt, E. (2017). Advanced Cyberinfrastructure for Science, Engineering, and Public Policy.  Computing Community Consortium. arXiv preprint arXiv:1707.00599.
 Honavar, V., Hill, M. Yelick, K. (2016). Accelerating Science: A Computing Research Agenda, Computing Community Consortium.
 Honavar, V. (2014). Honavar, V. (2014). The Promise and Potential of Big Data: A Case for Discovery Informatics Review of Policy Research 31:4 10.1111/ropr.12080.

Causal Inference
 Lee, S. and Honavar, V. (2020). Towards Robust Relational Causal Discovery. In: Proceedings of the Thirty-Fifth Conference on Uncertainty in Artificial Intelligence pp. 345–355 
 Kandasamy, S., Bhattacharyya, A., and Honavar, V. (2019). Minimum Intervention Cover of a Causal Graph. In: Proceedings of the 33rd AAAI Conference on Artificial Intelligence (AAAI-19).
 Khademi, A., Lee, S., Foley, D., and Honavar, V. (2019). Fairness in Algorithmic Decision Making: A Preliminary Excursion Through the Lens of Causality. In: Proceedings of the Web Conference. 
 Lee, S. and Honavar, V. (2017). Self-Discrepancy Conditional Independence Test. In: Conference on Uncertainty in Artificial Intelligence (UAI-17).
 Lee, S. and Honavar, V. (2017). A Kernel Independence Test for Relational Data. In: Conference on Uncertainty in Artificial Intelligence (UAI-17).
 Bui, N., Yen, J., and Honavar, V. (2016). Temporal Causality Analysis of Sentiment Change in a Cancer Survivor Network. IEEE Transactions on Computational Social Systems. 
 Lee, S. and Honavar, V. (2016). A Characterization of Markov Equivalence Classes of Relational Causal Models Under Path Semantics. In: Proceedings of the Conference on Uncertainty in Artificial Intelligence (UAI-16).
 Lee, S. and Honavar, V. (2016). On learning causal models from relational data. In: Proceedings of the Thirtieth AAAI Conference on Artificial Intelligence (AAAI-16).
 Bui, N., Yen, J. and Honavar, V. (2015). Temporal Causality of Social Support in an Online Community for Cancer Survivors In: International Conference on Social Computing, Behavioral-Cultural Modeling, and Prediction (SBP15). Springer-Verlag Lecture Notes in Computer Science, Vol. 9021, pp. 13–23.
 Lee, S., and Honavar, V. (2015). Lifted Representation of Relational Causal Models Revisited: Implications for Reasoning and Structure Learning In: Workshop on Advances in Causal Inference, Conference on Uncertainty in Artificial Intelligence, 2015.
 Bareinboim, E., Lee, S., Honavar, V. and Pearl, J. (2013). Transportability from Multiple Environments with Limited Experiments. In: Advances in Neural Information Systems (NIPS) 2013. pp. 136–144.
 Lee, S. and Honavar, V. (2013). Transportability of a Causal Effect from Multiple Environments. In: Proceedings of the 27th Conference on Artificial Intelligence (AAAI 2013).
 Lee, S. and Honavar, V. (2013). Causal Transportability of Experiments on Controllable Subsets of Variables: z-Transportability. In: Proceedings of the 29th Conference on Uncertainty in Artificial Intelligence (UAI 2013).

Machine learning, neural networks, and deep learning
 Liang, J., Wu, Y., Yu, D., and Honavar, V. (2021). Longitudinal Deep Kernel Gaussian Process Regression In: Proceedings of the 35th AAAI Conference on Artificial Intelligence. pp. 8556-8564
 Hsieh, T-Y., Sun, Y., Wang, S., and Honavar, V. (2021). Functional Autoencoders for Functional Data Representation Learning. In: Proceedings of the SIAM Conference on Data Mining. pp.666 - 674
 Hsieh, T-Y., Sun, Y., Tang, X., Wang, S., and Honavar, V. (2021). SrVARM: State Regularized Vector Autoregressive Model for Joint Learning of Hidden State Transitions and State-Dependent Inter-Variable Dependencies from Time Series Data In: Proceedings of the Web Conference. pp. 2270–2280
 Hsieh, T-Y., Sun, Y., Wang, S.m and Honavar, V. (2021). Explainable Multivariate Time Series Classification: A Deep Neural Network Which Learns To Attend To Important Variables As Well As Informative Time Intervals. In: Proceedings of the 14th International Conference on Web Search and Data Mining. pp. 607-615
 Liang, J., Xu, D., Sun, Y., and Honavar, V. (2020). LMLFM: longitudinal multi-level factorization machine. AAAI 2020: pp. 4811–4818
 Le. T. and Honavar, V. (2020). Dynamical Gaussian Process Latent Variable Model for Representation Learning from Longitudinal Data Proceedings of the 2020 ACM-IMS on Foundations of Data Science ConferenceOctober 2020 Pages 183–188. Dynamical Gaussian Process Latent Variable Model for Representation Learning from Longitudinal Data
 Sun, Y., Wang, S., Tang, X., Hsieh, T-Y., and Honavar, V. (2020). Adversarial Attacks on Graph Neural Networks via Node Injections: A Hierarchical Reinforcement Learning Approach. Proceedings of The Web Conference 2020 (WWW ’20) pp. 673-683.
 Sun, Y., Tang, X., Hsieh, T-Y., Wang, S., and Honavar, V. (2019). MEGAN: A Generative Adversarial Network Algorithm for Multi-View Network Embedding. In: Proceedings of the 28th International Joint Conference on Artificial Intelligence (IJCAI-2019). pp. 3527-3533
 Hsieh, T-Y, Sun, Y., Wang, S., and Honavar, V. (2019). Adaptive Structural Co-regularization for Unsupervised Multi-view Feature Selection. In: Proceedings of the IEEE International Conference on Big Knowledge (ICBK-2019). DOI 10.1109/ICBK.2019.00020
 Zhou, Y., Sun, Y., and Honavar, V. (2019). Improving Image Captioning by Leveraging Knowledge Graphs. IEEE Winter Conference on Applications of Computer Vision.
 Hsieh, T-Y., El-Manzalawy, Y., Sun, Y., and Honavar, V (2018). Compositional Stochastic Average Gradient for Machine Learning and Related Applications. In: Proceedings of the 19th International Conference on Intelligent Data Engineering and Automated Learning. pp. 740-752.
 Sun, Y., Bui, N., Hsieh, T-Y., and Honavar, V. (2018). Multi-View Network Embedding Via Graph Factorization Clustering and Co-Regularized Multi-View Agreement. IEEE ICDM International workshop on Graph Analytics. DOI: 10.1109/ICDMW.2018.00145
 Liang, J., Hu, J., Dong, S., and Honavar, V. (2018). Top-N-Rank: A Truncated List-wise Ranking Approach for Large-scale Top-N Recommendation. In: Proceedings of the IEEE International Conference on Big Data. DOI: 10.1109/BigData.2018.8621994
 Hu, J., Liang, J., Kuang, Y. and Honavar, V. (2018). A user similarity-based Top-N recommendation approach for mobile in-application advertising. Expert Systems With Applications. Vol. 111. pp. 51–60.
 Bui, N., Le, T., and Honavar, V. (2016).  Labeling Actors in Multi-view Social Networks by Integrating Information From Within and Across Multiple Views. In: Proceedings of the IEEE Conference on Big Data.
 Lin, H., Bui, N., and Honavar, V. (2015). Learning Classifiers from Remote RDF Data Stores Augmented with RDFS Subclass Hierarchies. In: 2nd International Workshop on High Performance Big Graph Data Management, Analysis, and Mining (BigGraph 2015), The IEEE International Conference on Big Data.
 Bui, N. and Honavar, V. (2014). Labeling Actors in Social Networks Using a Heterogeneous Graph Kernel. In: International Conference on Social Computing, Behavioral-Cultural Modeling, and Prediction (SBP14). pp. 27–34.
 Lin, H. and Honavar, V. (2013). Learning Classifiers from Chains of Multiple Interlinked RDF Data Stores. In: IEEE Big Data Congress. Best Student Paper Award.
 Lin, H., Lee, S., Bui, N. and Honavar, V. (2013). Learning Classifiers from Distributional Data. In: IEEE Big Data Congress.
 Bui, N. and Honavar, V. (2013). On the Utility of Abstraction in Labeling Actors in Social Networks. In: The 2013 IEEE/ACM International Conference on Advances in Social Networks Analysis and Mining.
 Silvescu, A. and Honavar, V. (2013). Abstraction Super-structuring Normal Forms: Towards a Theory of Structural Induction.  In: Algorithmic Probability and Friends. Bayesian Prediction and Artificial Intelligence (pp. 339–350). Springer Berlin Heidelberg.
 Tu, K. and Honavar, V. (2012). Unambiguity Regularization for Unsupervised Learning of Probabilistic Grammars. In: Proceedings of EMNLP-CoNLL 2012 : Conference on Empirical Methods in Natural Language Processing and Computational Natural Language Learning. pp. 1324–1334.
 Lin, H., Koul, N., and Honavar, V. (2011). Learning Relational Bayesian Classifiers from RDF Data. In: Proceedings of the International Semantic Web Conference (ISWC 2011). Springer-Verlag Lecture Notes in Computer Science Vol. 7031 pp. 389–404.
 Tu, K. and Honavar, V. (2011). On the Utility of Curricula in Unsupervised Learning of Grammars. In: Proceedings of the Twenty-Second International Joint Conference on Artificial Intelligence (IJCAI 2011) pp. 1523–1528.
 Tu, K., Ouyang, X., Han, D., Yu, Y., and Honavar, V. (2011). Exemplar-based Robust Coherent Biclustering. In: Proceedings of the SIAM Conference on Data Mining (SDM 2011). pp. 884–895.
 Yakhnenko, O., and Honavar, V. (2011). Multi-Instance Multi-Label Learning for Image Classification with Large Vocabularies. In: Proceedings of the British Machine Vision Conference.
 Caragea, C., Silvescu, A., Caragea, D. and Honavar, V. (2010). Abstraction-Augmented Markov Models. In: Proceedings of the IEEE Conference on Data Mining (ICDM 2010). IEEE Press. pp. 68–77.
 Koul, N. and Honavar, V. (2010). Learning in the Presence of Ontology Mapping Errors. In: Proceedings of the IEEE/WIC/ACM International Conference on Web Intelligence and Intelligent Agent Technology. pp. 291–296. ACM Press.
 Bromberg, F., Margaritis, D., and Honavar, V. (2009). Efficient Markov Network Structure Discovery from Independence Tests. Journal of Artificial Intelligence Research. Vol. 35. pp. 449–485.
 El-Manzalawi, Y. and Honavar, V. (2009). MICCLLR: Multiple-Instance Learning using Class Conditional Log Likelihood Ratio. In: Proceedings of the 12th International Conference on Discovery Science (DS 2009). Springer-Verlag Lecture Notes in Computer Science Vol. 5808, pp. 80–91, Berlin: Springer.
 Silvescu, A., Caragea, C. and Honavar, V. (2009). Combining Super-structuring and Abstraction on Sequence Classification. IEEE Conference on Data Mining (ICDM 2009).
 Yakhnenko, O., and Honavar, V. (2009). Multi-Modal Hierarchical Dirichlet Process Model for Predicting Image Annotation and Image-Object Label Correspondence. In: Proceedings of the SIAM Conference on Data Mining, SIAM. pp. 281–294
 Tu, K., and Honavar, V. (2008). Unsupervised Learning of Probabilistic Context-Free Grammar using Iterative Biclustering. . In: International Colloquium on Grammatical Inference (ICGI-2008). Springer-Verlag Lecture Notes in Computer Science vol. 5278 pp. 224–237.
 Yakhnenko, O. and Honavar, V. (2008). Annotating Images and Image Objects using a Hierarchical Dirichlet Process Model. 9th International Workshop on Multimedia Data Mining (SIGKDD MDM 2008), Las Vegas, ACM.
 
 Caragea, D., Zhang, J., Bao, J., Pathak, J., and Honavar, V. (2005). Algorithms and Software for Collaborative Discovery from Autonomous, Semantically Heterogeneous Information Sources (Invited paper). Proceedings of the 16th International Conference on Algorithmic Learning Theory. Lecture Notes in Computer Science, Singapore, Berlin: Springer-Verlag. Vol. 3734. pp. 13–44
Zhang, J., Caragea, D. and Honavar, V. Learning Ontology-Aware Classifiers. Proceedings of the 8th International Conference on Discovery Science. Springer-Verlag Lecture Notes in Computer Science, Singapore, Berlin: Springer-Verlag. Vol. 3735. pp. 308–321, 2005.
 Yakhnenko, O., Silvescu, A., and Honavar, V. (2005) Discriminatively Trained Markov Model for Sequence Classification. IEEE Conference on Data Mining (ICDM 2005), Houston, Texas, IEEE Press
 Kang, D-K., Zhang, J., Silvescu, A., and Honavar, V. (2005) Multinomial Event Model Based Abstraction for Sequence and Text Classification. Proceedings of the Symposium on Abstraction, Reformulation, and Approximation (SARA 2005), Edinburgh, UK, Berlin: Springer-Verlag. Vol. 3607. pp. 134–148.
 Wu. F., Zhang, J., and Honavar, V. (2005) Learning Classifiers Using Hierarchically Structured Class Taxonomies. Proceedings of the Symposium on Abstraction, Reformulation, and Approximation (SARA 2005), Edinburgh, Berlin, Springer-Verlag. Vol. 3607. pp. 313–320.
 
 Kang, D-K., Silvescu, A., Zhang, J. and Honavar, V. Generation of Attribute Value Taxonomies from Data for Accurate and Compact Classifier Construction. IEEE International Conference on Data Mining, IEEE Press. pp. 130–137, 2004.
 R. Polikar, L. Udpa, S. Udpa, and V. Honavar (2004). An Incremental Learning Algorithm with Confidence Estimation for Automated Identification of NDE Signals. IEEE Transactions of Ultrasonics, Ferroelectrics, and Frequency Control. Vol. 51. pp. 990–1001, 2004.
 Atramentov, A., Leiva, H., and Honavar, V. (2003). A Multi-Relational Decision Tree Learning Algorithm – Implementation and Experiments.. In: Proceedings of the Thirteenth International Conference on Inductive Logic Programming. Berlin: Springer-Verlag.
 Zhang, J. and Honavar, V. (2003). Learning Decision Tree Classifiers from Attribute Value Taxonomies and Partially Specified Data. In: Proceedings of the International Conference on Machine Learning (ICML-03).
 Zhang, J., Silvescu, A., and Honavar, V. (2002). Ontology-Driven Induction of Decision Trees at Multiple Levels of Abstraction. In: Proceedings of Symposium on Abstraction, Reformulation, and Approximation. Berlin: Springer-Verlag.
 Polikar, R., Udpa, L., Udpa, S., and Honavar, V. (2001). Learn++: An Incremental Learning Algorithm for Multi-Layer Perceptron Networks. IEEE Transactions on Systems, Man, and Cybernetics. Vol. 31, No. 4. pp. 497–508.
 Parekh, R. and Honavar, V. (2001). DFA Learning from Simple Examples. Machine Learning. Vol. 44. pp. 9–35.
 Silvescu, A., and Honavar, V. (2001). Temporal Boolean Network Models of Genetic Networks and Their Inference from Gene Expression Time Series. Complex Systems.. Vol. 13. No. 1. pp. 54-.
 Balakrishnan, K., Bousquet, O. and Honavar, V. (2000). Spatial Learning and Localization in Animals: A Computational Model and Its Implications for Mobile Robots, Adaptive Behavior. Vol. 7. no. 2. pp. 173–216.
 Caragea, D., Silvescu, A., and Honavar, V. (2000). Agents That Learn from Distributed Dynamic Data Sources. In: Proceedings of the ECML 2000/Agents 2000 Workshop on Learning Agents. Barcelona, Spain.
 Parekh, R. and Honavar, V. (2000). On the Relationships between Models of Learning in Helpful Environments. In: Proceedings of the Fifth International Conference on Grammatical Inference. Lisbon, Portugal.
 Parekh, R., Yang, J., and Honavar, V. (2000). Constructive Neural Network Learning Algorithms for Multi-Category Pattern Classification. IEEE Transactions on Neural Networks. Vol. 11. No. 2. pp. 436–451.
 Polikar, R., Udpa, L., Udpa, S., and Honavar, V. (2000). Learn++: An Incremental Learning Algorithm for Multilayer Perceptron Networks. In: Proceedings of the IEEE Conference on Acoustics, Speech, and Signal Processing (ICASSP) 2000. Istanbul, Turkey.
 Yang, J., Parekh, R. & Honavar, V. (2000). Comparison of Performance of Variants of Single-Layer Perceptron Algorithms on Non-Separable Data. Neural, Parallel, and Scientific Computation. Vol. 8. pp. 415–438.
 Yang, J. and Honavar, V. (1999). DistAl: An Inter-Pattern Distance Based Constructive Neural Network Learning Algorithm.. Intelligent Data Analysis. Vol. 3. pp. 55–73.
 Parekh, R. and Honavar, V. (1999). Simple DFA are Polynomially Probably Exactly Learnable from Simple Examples. In: Proceedings of the International Conference on Machine Learning. Bled, Slovenia.
 Bousquet, O., Balakrishnan, K. and Honavar, V. (1998). Is the Hippocampus a Kalman Filter?. In: Proceedings of the Pacific Symposium on Biocomputing. Singapore: World Scientific. pp. 655–666.
 Parekh, R., Nichitiu, C., and Honavar, V. (1998). A Polynomial Time Incremental Algorithm for Learning DFA. In: Proceedings of the Fourth International Colloquium on Grammatical Inference (ICGI'98), Ames, IA. Lecture Notes in Computer Science vol. 1433 pp. 37–49. Berlin: Springer-Verlag.
 Yang, J. and Honavar, V. (1998). Feature Subset Selection Using a Genetic Algorithm. IEEE Intelligent Systems (Special Issue on Feature Transformation and Subset Selection). vol. 13. pp. 44–49.
 Parekh, R.G., Yang, J., and Honavar, V. (1997). MUPStart – A Constructive Neural Network Learning Algorithm for Multi-Category Pattern Classification. In: Proceedings of the IEEE International Conference on Neural Networks (ICNN'97). Houston, TX. pp. 1924–1929.
 Parekh, R.G., Yang, J., and Honavar, V. (1997). Pruning Strategies for Constructive Neural Network Learning Algorithms. In: Proceedings of the IEEE International Conference on Neural Networks (ICNN'97). Houston, TX. pp. 1960–1965. June 9–12, 1997.
 Parekh, R.G. and Honavar, V. (1997) Learning DFA from Simple Examples. In: Proceedings of the International Workshop on Algorithmic Learning Theory. (ALT 97). Sendai, Japan. Lecture notes in Computer Science. Vol. 1316 pp. 116–131.
 Chen, C-H., Parekh, R., Yang, J., Balakrishnan, K. and Honavar, V. (1995). Analysis of Decision Boundaries Generated by Constructive Neural Network Learning Algorithms. In: Proceedings of the World Congress on Neural Networks (WCNN'95). Washington, D.C. July 17–21, 1995. pp. 628–635.
 
 Honavar, V. (1992). Some Biases for Efficient Learning of Spatial, Temporal, and Spatio-Temporal Patterns. In: Proceedings of International Joint Conference on Neural Networks. Beijing, China.

Knowledge representation and semantic web
 
 Santhanam, G.R., Basu, S. and Honavar, V. (2013) Verifying preferential equivalence and subsumption via model checking. In International Conference on Algorithmic DecisionTheory (pp. 324–335). Springer Berlin Heidelberg.
 Tao, J., Slutzki, G., and Honavar, V. (2012). PSpace Tableau Algorithms for Acyclic Modalized ALC. Journal of Automated Reasoning. Vol. 49. pp. 551–582
 
 Santhanam, G., Suvorov, Y., Basu, S., and Honavar, V. (2011). Verifying Intervention Policies for Countering Infection Propagation over Networks: A Model Checking Approach. In: Proceedings of the Twenty-Fifth Conference on Artificial Intelligence (AAAI-2011). pp. 1408–1414.
 Sanghvi, B., Koul, N., and Honavar, V. (2010). Identifying and Eliminating Inconsistencies in Mappings across Hierarchical Ontologies. In: Springer-Verlag Lecture Notes in Computer Science Vol. 6427, pp. 999–1008. Berlin: Springer.
 Santhanam, G., Basu, S., and Honavar, V. (2010). Efficient Dominance Testing for Unconditional Preferences. In: Proceedings of the Twelfth International Conference on the Principles of Knowledge Representation and Reasoning (KR 2010). pp. 590–592. AAAI Press.
 Santhanam, G., Basu, S., and Honavar, V. (2010). Dominance Testing Via Model Checking. In: Proceedings of the 24th AAAI Conference on Artificial Intelligence (AAAI-10). pp. 357–362. AAAI Press.
 Bao, J., Voutsadakis G., Slutzki, G. Honavar:, V. (2009). Package-Based Description Logics. In: Modular Ontologies: Concepts, Theories and Techniques for Knowledge Modularization. Lecture Notes in Computer Science Vol. 5445, pp. 349–371
 Bao, J., Voutsadakis, G., Slutzki, G., and Honavar, V. (2008). On the Decidability of Role Mappings between Modular Ontologies. In: Proceedings of the 23nd Conference on Artificial Intelligence (AAAI-2008), Menlo Park, CA: AAAI Press, pp. 400–405
 Bao, J., Slutzki, G., and Honavar, V. (2007). A Semantic Importing Approach to Knowledge Reuse from Multiple Ontologies.. In: Proceedings of the 22nd Conference on Artificial Intelligence (AAAI-2007). Vancouver, Canada. Semantic Importing Approach to Knowledge Reuse from Multiple Ontologies. pp. 1304–1309. AAAI Press.
 Bao, J., Slutzki, G., and Honavar, V. (2007). Privacy-Preserving Reasoning on the Semantic Web. IEEE/WIC/ACM Conference on Web Intelligence. IEEE. pp. 791–797
 Bao, J., Caragea, D., and Honavar, V. (2006). On the Semantics of Linking and Importing in Modular Ontologies.In: Proceedings of the International Semantic Web Conference (ISWC 2006), Lecture Notes in Computer Science, Berlin: Springer. Lecture Notes in Computer Science Vol. 4273, pp. 72–86.
 Bao, J., Caragea, D., and Honavar, V. (2006). A Tableau Based Federated Reasoning Algorithm for Modular Ontologies. In: Proceedings of the ACM/IEEE/WIC Conference on Web Intelligence. IEEE Press. pp. 404–410.
 Bao, J., Caragea, D., and Honavar, V. A Distributed Tableau Algorithm for Package-based Description Logics. Proceedings of the Second International Workshop on Context Representation and Reasoning (CRR 2006), Riva del Garda, Italy, CEUR. 2006.
 Bao, J., Caragea, D., and Honavar, V. Modular Ontologies – A Formal Investigation of Semantics and Expressivity. In Proceedings of the First Asian Semantic Web Conference, Beijing, China, Springer-Verlag. Vol. Vol. 4185, pp. 616–631, 2006. Best Paper Award
 Silvescu, A. and Honavar, V. Independence, Decomposability and functions which take values into an Abelian Group. Proceedings of the Ninth International Symposium on Artificial Intelligence and Mathematics, 9th AI and MATH Symposium - Proceedings, 2006.

Data and Computational Infrastructure for Collaborative Science
 Parashar, M., Honavar, V., Simonet, A., Rodero, I., Ghahramani, F., Agnew, G., and Jantz, R. (2020). The Virtual Data Collaboratory: A Regional Cyberinfrastructure for Collaborative Data-Driven Research. Computing in Science and Engineering 22:3:79-92
 Santhanam, G.R., Basu, S. and Honavar, V. (2013). Preference based service adaptation using service substitution. In Proceedings of the 2013 IEEE/WIC/ACM International Joint Conferences on Web Intelligence (WI) and Intelligent Agent Technologies (IAT)-Volume 01 (pp. 487–493). IEEE Computer Society.
 Sun, H., Basu, S., Honavar, V., and Lutz, R. (2010). Automata-Based Verification of Security Requirements of Composite Web Services. In: Proceedings of the IEEE International Symposium on Software Reliability Engineering (ISSRE-2010). pp. 348–357, IEEE Press.
 Santhanam, G.R., Basu, S., and Honavar, V. (2009). Web Service Substitution Based on Preferences Over Non-functional Attributes. In: Proceedings of the IEEE International Conference on Services Computing (SCC 2009).
 Pathak, J., Basu, S., and Honavar, V. (2008). Composing Web Services through Automatic Reformulation of Service Specifications. Proceedings of the IEEE International Conference on Services Computing, IEEE, pp. 361–369.
 
 Santhanam, G., Basu, S., and Honavar, V. (2008). TCP-Compose* - A TCP-net based Algorithm for Efficient Composition of Web Services Based on Qualitative Preferences. Proceedings of the 6th International Conference on Service Oriented Computing, Springer-Verlag Lecture Notes in Computer Science, Vol. 5254. pp. 453–467
 Pathak, J., Basu, S., and Honavar, V. (2007). On Context-Specific Substitutability of Web Services. In: Proceedings of the IEEE International Conference on Web Services. pp. 192–199. IEEE Press.
 Pathak, J., Li, Y., Honavar, V., McCalley, J. (2007). A Service-Oriented Architecture for Electric Power Transmission System Asset Management. Second International Workshop on Engineering Service-Oriented Applications: Design and Composition, Lecture Notes in Computer Science, Berlin: Springer-Verlag, 2007.
 Pathak, J., Basu, S., Lutz, R., and Honavar, V. (2006). Selecting and Composing Web Services through Iterative Reformulation of Functional Specifications. Proceedings of the IEEE International Conference on Tools With Artificial Intelligence (ICTAI 2006), Washington, DC, IEEE Press. Best Paper Award. pp. 445–454.
 Pathak, J., Basu, S., and Honavar, V. (2006). Modeling Web Services by Iterative Reformulation of Functional and Non-Functional Requirements. Proceedings of the International Conference on Service Oriented Computing. Lecture Notes in Computer Science, Berlin: Springer, Vol. 4294, pp. 314–326.
 Pathak, J., Yuan, L., Honavar, V., and McCalley, J. (2006). A Service-Oriented Architecture for Electric Power Transmission System Asset Management, In: Proceedings of the Second International Workshop on Engineering Service-Oriented Applications: Design and Composition (WESOA-2006), Lecture Notes in Computer Science, Berlin: Springer-Verlag.
 Pathak, J., Basu, S., Lutz, R., and Honavar, V. (2006). Parallel Web Service Composition in MoSCoE: A Choreography Based Approach. Proceedings of the IEEE European Conference on Web Services (ECOWS 2006), Zurich, Switzerland, IEEE. In press.
 Pathak, J., Basu, S., and Honavar, V. Modeling Web Service Composition Using Symbolic Transition Systems. AAAI '06 Workshop on AI-Driven Technologies for Services-Oriented Computing (AI-SOC), Boston, MA, AAAI Press, 2006.
 Pathak, J., Koul, N., Caragea, D., and Honavar, V. A Framework for Semantic Web Services Discovery. Proceedings of the 7th ACM International Workshop on Web Information and Data Management (WIDM 2005)., ACM Press. pp. 45–50, 2005.
 Pathak, J., Caragea, D., and Honavar, V. Ontology-Extended Component-Based Workflows: A Framework for Constructing Complex Workflows from Semantically Heterogeneous Software Components. VLDB-04 Workshop on Semantic Web and Databases. Springer-Verlag Lecture Notes in Computer Science., Toronto, Springer-Verlag. Vol. 3372. pp. 41–56, 2004.

Applied Informatics: Bioinformatics, Health informatics, Materials Informatics
 Geng, C., Jung, Y., Renaud, N., Honavar, V., Bonvin, A., Xue, L. (2020). iScore: A novel graph kernel-based function for scoring protein-protein docking models, Bioinformatics Validate User
 Hou Y, Wu C, Yang D, Ye T, Honavar VG, Van Duin AC, Wang K, Priya S.(2020) Two-dimensional hybrid organic–inorganic perovskites as emergent ferroelectric materials. Journal of Applied Physics 128, Two-dimensional hybrid organic–inorganic perovskites as emergent ferroelectric materials.
 Renaud, N., Jung, Y., Honavar, V., Geng, C., Bonvin, A.M. and Xue, L.C. (2020). iScore: An MPI supported software for ranking protein–protein docking models based on a random walk graph kernel and support vector machines. SoftwareX, 11, p. 100462.
 Khademi, A., El-Manzalawi, A., Master, L., Buxton, O., and Honavar, V. (2019). Personalized Sleep Parameters Estimation from Actigraphy: A Machine Learning Approach. Nature and Science of Sleep. 
 Abbas, M., Matta, J., Le, Thanh, Bensmail, H.,Obafemi-Ajayi, T., Honavar, V., and El-Manzalawi, Y. (2019). Biomarker discovery in inflammatory bowel diseases using network-based feature selection. PLOS One Biomarker discovery in inflammatory bowel diseases using network-based feature selection.
 Jung Y, El‐Manzalawy Y, Dobbs D, Honavar VG (2019). Partner‐specific prediction of RNA‐binding residues in proteins: A critical assessment. Proteins: Structure, Function, and Bioinformatics pp. 1–14 Partner‐specific prediction of RNA‐binding residues in proteins: A critical assessment
 Khademi, A., El-Manzalawy, Y., Buxton, O., and Honavar, V. (2018). Toward Personalized Sleep/Wake Prediction from Actigraphy. IEEE International Conference on Biomedical and Health Informatics. pp. 414–417. IEEE.
  El-Manzalawy, Y., Hsieh, T-Y., Shivakumar, M., Kim, D., and Honavar, V. (2018). Min-Redundancy and Max-Relevance Multi-view Feature Selection for Predicting Ovarian Cancer Survival using Multi-omics Data. (Preliminary version presented at: Translational Bioinformatics Conference). BMC Genomics.
 Abbas M, Le T, Bensmail H, Honavar V, El-Manzalawy Y (2018). Microbiomarkers Discovery in Inflammatory Bowel Diseases using Network-Based Feature Selection. Proceedings of the 9th ACM Conference on Bioinformatics, Computational Biology and Health Informatics.
 Gur, S., and Honavar, V. (2018). PATENet: Pairwise Alignment of Time Evolving Networks.. in: Proceedings of the 14th International Conference on Machine Learning and Data Mining in Pattern Recognition. Lecture Notes in Computer Science, vol. 10934 LNAI, Springer Verlag, pp. 85–98
 El-Manzalawy, Y., Dobbs, D., and Honavar, V. (2017). In silico prediction of linear B-cell epitopes on proteins. In: Y. Zhou, E. Faraggi, A. Kloczkowski and Y. Yang (Eds.), Prediction of Protein Secondary Structure, Methods in Molecular Biology, vol. 1484, .
 El-Manzalawy, Y., Buxton, O., and Honavar, V. (2017). Sleep/wake state prediction and sleep parameter estimation using unsupervised classification via clustering. In: IEEE Conference on Bioinformatics and Biomedicine.
 Walia, R., El-Manzalawy, Y., Dobbs, D., and Honavar, V. (2017). Sequence-based Prediction of RNA-binding Residues in Proteins. In: Y. Zhou, E. Faraggi, A. Kloczkowski and Y. Yang (Eds.), Prediction of Protein Secondary Structure, Methods in Molecular Biology, vol. 1484, .
 El-Manzalawy, Y., Munoz, E., Lindner, S.E., and Honavar, V. (2016). PlasmoSEP: Predicting surface-exposed proteins on the malaria parasite using semisupervised self-training and expert-annotated data. Proteomics. .
 
 
 
 El-Manzalawy. Y. and Honavar, V. (2014). Building Classifier Ensembles for B-Cell Epitope Prediction. In: De, R.K. and Tomar, N. (Ed). Immunoinformatics, Springer Protocols Methods in Molecular Biology, Vol. 1184. pp. 285–294.
 
 
 
 El-Manzalawy, Y., Dobbs, D., and Honavar, V. (2012). Predicting protective bacterial antigens using random forest classifiers.. ACM Conference on Bioinformatics and Computational Biology pp. 426–433, 2012.
 
 
 Towfic, F., Kohutyuk, O., Greenlee, MHW., and Honavar, V. (2012). Bionetworkbench: Database and Software for Storage, Query, and Interactive Analysis of Gene and Protein Networks. Bioinformatics and Biology Insights. Vol. 6. pp. 235–246.
 
 
 Lewis, B.A., Walia, R.R., Terribilini, M., Ferguson, J., Zheng, C., Honavar, V., and Dobbs, D. (2011). PRIDB: A Protein-RNA Interface Database. Nucleic Acids Research. D277-282. .
 
 Tuggle, C. K., Towfic, F. and Honavar, V. G. (2011) Introduction to Systems Biology for Animal Scientists, in Systems Biology and Livestock Science (eds M. F. W. te Pas, H. Woelders and A. Bannink), Wiley-Blackwell, Oxford, UK. 
 
 
 
 El-Manzalawy, Y. and Honavar, V. (2010). Recent Advances in B-Cell Epitope Prediction Methods. Immunome Research Suppl. 2:S2.
 
 
 
 
 
 Towfic, F., Greenlee, H., and Honavar, V. (2009). Aligning Biomolecular Networks Using Modular Graph Kernels. In: Proceedings of the 9th Workshop on Algorithms in Bioinformatics (WABI 2009). Berlin: Springer-Verlag: LNBI Vol. 5724, pp. 345–361.
 Towfic, F., Greenlee, H., and Honavar, V. (2009). Detecting Orthologous Genes Based on Protein-Protein Interaction Networks. In: Proceedings of the IEEE Conference on Bioinformatics and Biomedicine (BIBM 2009). IEEE Press.
 Dunn-Thomas, T., Dobbs, D.L., Sakaguchi, D. Young, M.J. Honavar, V. Greenlee, H. M. W. (2008). Proteomic Differentiation Between Murine Retinal and Brain Derived Progenitor Cells. Stem Cells and Development. 17:119–131.
 
 El-Manzalawy, Y., Dobbs, D., and Honavar, V. (2008). Predicting Flexible Length Linear B-cell Epitopes, 7th International Conference on Computational Systems Bioinformatics, Stanford, CA. Singapore: World Scientific.
 El-Manzalawy, Y., Dobbs, D., and Honavar, V. (2008). Predicting linear B-cell epitopes using string kernels. Journal of Molecular Recognition, 
 El-Manzalawy, Y., Dobbs, D., and Honavar, V. (2008). Predicting Protective Linear B-cell Epitopes using Evolutionary Information. IEEE Conference on Bioinformatics and Biomedicine, pp. 289–292, IEEE Press.
 Hecker, L., Alcon, T., Honavar, V., and Greenlee, H. Analysis and Interpretation of Large-Scale Gene Expression Data Sets Using a Seed Network. Journal of Bioinformatics and Biology Insights. Vol. 2. pp. 91–102, 2008.
 
 Lee. J-H., Hamilton, M., Gleeson, C., Caragea, C., Zaback, P., Sander, J., Lee, X., Wu, F., Terribilini, M., Honavar, V. and Dobbs, D. Striking Similarities in Diverse Telomerase Proteins Revealed by Combining Structure Prediction and Machine Learning Approaches.. In Proceedings of the Pacific Symposium on Biocomputing (PSB 2008). Vol. 13. pp. 501–512, 2008.
 
 
 
 Caragea, C., Sinapov, J., Dobbs, D., and Honavar, V. (2007). Assessing the Performance of Macromolecular Sequence Classifiers, In: Proceedings of the IEEE Conference on Bioinformatics and Bioengineering (BIBE 2007). pp. 320–326, 2007.
 Caragea, C., Sinapov, J., Silvescu, A., Dobbs, D. And Honavar, V. (2007). Glycosylation Site Prediction Using Ensembles of Support Vector Machine Classifiers. BMC Bioinformatics .
 Terribilini, M., Sander, J.D., Lee, J-H., Zaback, P., Jernigan, R.L., Honavar, V. and Dobbs, D. (2007). RNABindR: A Server for Analyzing and Predicting RNA Binding Sites in Proteins. Nucleic Acids Research. 
 Bao, J., Hu, Z., Caragea, D., Reecy, J., and Honavar, V. A Tool for Collaborative Construction of Large Biological Ontologies. Fourth International Workshop on Biological Data Management (BIDM 2006), Krakov, Poland, IEEE Press. pp. 191–195.
 Yan, C., Terribilini, M., Wu, F., Jernigan, R.L., Dobbs, D. and Honavar, V. (2006) Identifying amino acid residues involved in protein-DNA interactions from sequence. BMC Bioinformatics, 2006.
 Lonosky, P., Zhang, X., Honavar, V., Dobbs, D., Fu, A., and Rodermel, S. (2004) A Proteomic Analysis of Chloroplast Biogenesis in Maize. Plant Physiology Vol. 134. pp. 560–574, 2004.
 Sen, T.Z., Kloczkowski, A., Jernigan, R.L., Yan, C., Honavar, V., Ho, K-M., Wang, C-Z., Ihm, Y., Cao, H., Gu, X., and Dobbs, D. Predicting Binding Sites of Protease-Inhibitor Complexes by Combining Multiple Methods. BMC Bioinformatics. Vol. 5. pp. 205, 2004.
 Yan, C., Dobbs, D., and Honavar, V. A Two-Stage Classifier for Identification of Protein-Protein Interface Residues. Bioinformatics. Vol. 20. pp. i371-378, 2004.
 Yan, C., Dobbs, D., and Honavar, V. Identifying Protein-Protein Interaction Sites from Surface Residues  A Support Vector Machine Approach. Neural Computing Applications. Vol. 13. pp. 123–129, 2004.
 
 Silvescu, A., and Honavar, V. (2001). Temporal Boolean Network Models of Genetic Networks and Their Inference from Gene Expression Time Series. Complex Systems. Vol. 13. No. 1. pp. 54-.

Computer and information security
 Liang, J., Guo, W., Luo, T., Honavar, V., Wang, G., and Xing, X. (2021) FARE: Enabling Fine-grained Attack Categorization under Low-quality Labeled Data. In: Proceedings of the Network and Distributed System Security Symposium. 
 Oster, Z., Santhanam, G., Basu, S. and Honavar, V. (2013). Model Checking of Qualitative Sensitivity Preferences to Minimize Credential Disclosure. International Symposium on Formal Aspects of Component Software. Springer-Verlag Lecture Notes in Computer Science Vol. 7684, pp. 205–223, 2013.
 
 
 Kang, D-K., Fuller, D., and Honavar, V. Learning Misuse and Anomaly Detectors from System Call Frequency Vector Representation. IEEE International Conference on Intelligence and Security Informatics. Springer-Verlag Lecture Notes in Computer Science, Springer-Verlag. Vol. 3495. pp. 511–516, 2005.

Honors
 National Science Foundation Director's Award for Superior Accomplishment, 2013
 National Science Foundation Director's Award for Collaborative Integration, 2012
 Margaret Ellen White Graduate Faculty Award, Iowa State University, 2011
 Outstanding Career Achievement in Research Award, College of Liberal Arts and Sciences, Iowa State University, 2008
 Regents Award for Faculty Excellence, Iowa Board of Regents, 2007
 Edward Frymoyer Endowed Chair in Information Sciences and Technology, Penn State College of Information Sciences and Technology, Pennsylvania State University, 2013
 Senior Faculty Research Excellence Award, Penn State College of Information Sciences and Technology, Pennsylvania State University, 2016
 125 People of Impact, Department of Electrical and Computer Engineering, University of Wisconsin-Madison, 2016
 Sudha Murty Distinguished (Visiting) Chair of Neurocomputing and Data Science, Indian Institute of Science, 2016-2021
 ACM Distinguished Member Association for Computing Machinery, 2018
 AAAS Fellow American Association for the Advancement of Science, 2018
 EAI Fellow European Alliance for Innovation, 2019
 Dorothy Foehr Huck and J. Lloyd Huck Chair in Biomedical Data Sciences and Artificial Intelligence, Pennsylvania State University, 2021

References

External links
 Personal home page

Artificial intelligence researchers
Machine learning researchers
American bioinformaticians
American non-fiction writers
Systems biologists
American cognitive scientists
Complex systems scientists
Computer scientists
Pennsylvania State University faculty
Iowa State University faculty
University of Wisconsin–Madison College of Letters and Science alumni
Drexel University alumni
Bangalore University alumni
Senior Members of the IEEE
Fellows of the American Association for the Advancement of Science
Living people
American male writers of Indian descent
1960 births
People from Pune
People from Bangalore
Male non-fiction writers